Rebstein-Marbach railway station is a railway station in Rebstein, in the Swiss canton of St. Gallen. It is an intermediate stop on the Chur–Rorschach line.

Services 
Rebstein-Marbach is served by two services of the St. Gallen S-Bahn:

 : hourly service between Nesslau-Neu St. Johann and Altstätten SG
 : hourly service via Sargans (circular operation).

References

External links 
 
 

Railway stations in the canton of St. Gallen
Swiss Federal Railways stations